Ciarimbolo is an Italian meat produced from pig. Pork offal, it is spread on bread. It is listed on the Ark of Taste.

References

Italian cuisine
Ark of Taste foods